Prelec is a Croatian and Slovenian surname. Notable people with the surname include:

Drazen Prelec (born 1955), American professor of management science and economics 
Ivan Prelec (born 1987), Croatian football manager 

Croatian surnames
Slovene-language surnames